William Alfred Edward (19 June 1916 – October 2005) was a Scottish cricketer.

Edward was an allrounder and played his club cricket with Clydesdale, scoring 3,284 runs and taking 343 wickets. He represented Scotland in first-class cricket with a highest of 99 runs against Ireland in 1950.

References

Cricket Europe

External links
 

1916 births
2005 deaths
Scottish cricketers
Cricketers from Glasgow
Scottish emigrants to Canada
Clydesdale CC players